Sally Gibson is an author, archivist and heritage consultant who resides in Toronto and has written three books about the city and its heritage. She has a Master of Urban Studies from Yale University, and a Master of Library Science and a Ph.D. in Urban Geography from the University of Toronto. Gibson grew up in New Jersey, went to Vassar College, and moved to Toronto in 1969.  Her first book, More than an Island: A History of the Toronto Island was described by urban thinker Jane Jacobs as "city history at its very best".  Her second book, Inside Toronto: Urban Interiors 1880s to 1920s, was a finalist for the City of Toronto Book Award and won a Heritage Toronto Book Award of Excellence in 2007.  Her third book, Toronto’s Distillery District: History by the Lake, evolved from her work as the Distillery District's site historian and won a Heritage Toronto Book Award of Merit in 2009.

Publications

Toronto's Distillery District: History by the Lake. Toronto: Distillery Historic District, 2008.  
Inside Toronto: Urban Interiors 1880s to 1920s. Toronto: Cormorant Books, 2006  ,  
More Than an Island: A History of the Toronto Island. Toronto: Irwin, 1984  ,

Awards

 Heritage Toronto Award of Merit 2009, for Toronto's Distillery District: History by the Lake
Canadian Association of Heritage Professionals, Communications Award 2009, for Distillery District Tenant Handouts Project
Heritage Toronto Award of Excellence 2008, for Distillery District Heritage Website at www.distilleryheritage.com
Canadian Association of Heritage Professionals, Communications Award 2008, for Distillery District Heritage Website at www.distilleryheritage.com
Heritage Toronto Award of Excellence 2007, for Inside Toronto: Urban Interiors 1880s-1920s
City of Toronto Book Award finalist 2007, for Inside Toronto: Urban Interiors 1880s-1920s  
Canadian Association of Heritage Professionals Communications Award 2007, for Inside Toronto: Urban Interiors 1880s-1920s

See also
 Toronto Islands
Distillery District

References

Living people
21st-century Canadian historians
Vassar College alumni
Yale University alumni
University of Toronto alumni
Canadian women historians
Year of birth missing (living people)